Love Chronicles is the second studio album of Scottish folk artist Al Stewart, released in September 1969. It was his first album to be released in the US (and was also the only one of his first four albums). Among the supporting musicians were Jimmy Page and four members of Fairport Convention: bassist Ashley Hutchings, guitarist Simon Nicol (listed as "Simon Breckenridge"), drummer Martin Lamble (as Martyn Francis) and guitarist Richard Thompson (listed as "Marvyn Prestwick"). The songwriting is generally stark.

Love Chronicles was released in the UK as part of a double album To Whom It May Concern, which is an anthology of Stewart's first three albums. In 2007, Love Chronicles was issued for the first time on CD with some bonus tracks.

Track listing
All tracks composed and arranged by Al Stewart

Original LP release
 "In Brooklyn" – 3:42
 "Old Compton Street Blues" – 4:25
 "The Ballad of Mary Foster" – 8:01
 "Life and Life Only" – 5:47
 "You Should Have Listened to Al" – 3:01
 "Love Chronicles" – 18:06

Cassette release
 "You Should Have Listened to Al"
 "Old Compton Street Blues"
 "The Ballad of Mary Foster"
 "Life and Life Only"
 "In Brooklyn"
 "Love Chronicles"

2007 Collectors' Choice Music edition

 "In Brooklyn" – 3:43
 "Old Compton Street Blues" – 4:26
 "The Ballad of Mary Foster" – 8:02
 "Life and Life Only" – 5:49
 "You Should Have Listened to Al" – 3:02
 "Love Chronicles" – 18:04
Bonus tracks
 "Jackdaw" – 3:20
 "She Follows Her Own Rules" (Al Stewart, Peter White) – 3:18
 "Fantasy" – 2:15

Personnel
 Al Stewart – vocals, guitar
 Jimmy Page – guitar on "Love Chronicles"
 Simon Breckenridge (pseudonym for Simon Nicol) – guitar
 Marvyn Prestwyck (pseudonym for Richard Thompson) – guitar
 Brian Brocklehurst – bass
 Harvey Burns – drums
 Martyn Francis (pseudonym of Martin Lamble) – drums
 Brian Odgers – bass
 John Paul Jones – bass on "Love Chronicles"
 Ashley Hutchings – bass
 Steve Gray – organ
 Phil Phillips – organ
Krysia Kristianne, Robin Lamble – backing vocals on "Jackdaw"

Technical
Ron Pender, John Wood – engineer
Sophie Litchfield – photography

References

External links
 

Al Stewart albums
1969 albums
Albums produced by John Wood (record producer)
CBS Records albums
Epic Records albums
Collectors' Choice Music albums